Mohamed Atmani (born 30 June 1937) is a Moroccan boxer. He competed in the men's welterweight event at the 1960 Summer Olympics. At the 1960 Summer Olympics, he lost to Viljo Aho of Finland.

References

External links
 

1937 births
Living people
Moroccan male boxers
Olympic boxers of Morocco
Boxers at the 1960 Summer Olympics
People from Oujda
Welterweight boxers